Velká Skrovnice is a municipality and village in Ústí nad Orlicí District in the Pardubice Region of the Czech Republic. It has about 300 inhabitants.

Administrative parts
The village of Malá Skrovnice is an administrative part of Velká Skrovnice.

References

Villages in Ústí nad Orlicí District